Arraial do Cabo is a municipality located in the Brazilian state of Rio de Janeiro.

It was founded in 1503 by the conqueror Amerigo Vespucci. In 1960 a documentary film was made directed by Mário Carneiro and Paulo Cesar Saraceni about the local fishing industry.

Its geography made Arraial do Cabo an important and dangerous point in the age of sail. From the arrival of the Portuguese Navy in 1503 through the nineteenth century, many shipwrecks occurred. Due to this fact (and other biological factors) Arraial do Cabo is well known as the "Dive Capital".

The municipality operates the Ilha do Cabo Frio Biological Reserve, a fully protected conservation unit on an Atlantic island in the south east of the municipality.
It contains the  Arraial do Cabo Marine Extractive Reserve, created in 1997.

Climate

References

Populated coastal places in Rio de Janeiro (state)
Municipalities in Rio de Janeiro (state)
Populated places established in 1503